Qındırğa (also, Qındırqa, Kandyrga, and Kyndyrga) is a village and the least populous municipality in the Qakh Rayon of Azerbaijan.  It has a population of 105.

References

External links 

Populated places in Qakh District